Midlothian in Scotland is a county constituency of the House of Commons of the Parliament of the United Kingdom. It elects one Member of Parliament (MP) by the first-past-the-post voting system.

It replaced Midlothian and Peeblesshire at the 1955 general election.
A similar constituency, also called Midlothian, was used by the Scottish Parliament until 2011.

Boundaries 

1955–1974: The county of Midlothian, including all the burghs situated therein, except the county of the city of Edinburgh and the burgh of Musselburgh.

1974–1983: As above.

1983–1997: Midlothian District.

1997–2005: The Midlothian District electoral wards of Bonnyrigg/Newtongrange, Dalkeith, Loanhead, and Mayfield/Gorebridge.

2005–present: The area of the Midlothian Council.

The constituency covers the whole of the Midlothian Council area. Until recently, it covered a slightly smaller area, but in 2005 Penicuik was moved into the constituency from Tweeddale, Ettrick and Lauderdale.

It has covered a much larger area in the past, once covering the whole of the traditional county of Midlothian, apart from Edinburgh.

Members of Parliament 
Current MP: Owen Thompson, Scottish National Party

Election results

Elections in the 2010s

Elections in the 2000s

Elections in the 1990s

Elections in the 1980s

Elections in the 1970s

Elections in the 1960s

Elections in the 1950s

References 

Westminster Parliamentary constituencies in Scotland
Politics of Midlothian
Constituencies of the Parliament of the United Kingdom established in 1955
Dalkeith
Bonnyrigg and Lasswade